Manzano is a Spanish word used for apple trees, Malus domestica, and is also used as a patronymic name. Manzano can refer to any of the following:

Places 
 El Manzano, a village in Spain
 Manzano, Italy, a municipality in Italy
 Manzano, New Mexico, a town in New Mexico, USA
 the Manzano Mountains in New Mexico, USA
 Manzano Peak, the highest peak in the Manzano Mountains
 Manzano Amargo, a municipality in Argentina
 Manzano Springs, a census-designated place in New Mexico, USA
 Arroyo Manzano, a neighbourhood of Santo Domingo, Dominican Republic
 Cuyín Manzano, a municipality in Argentina
 Salinas del Manzano, a municipality in Spain

People 
 Maria Rosa Calvo-Manzano, Spanish musician
 Alberto Manzano, Cuban pole-vaulter
 Andi Manzano, Philippine disk jockey
 Edu Manzano, Philippine actor and politician
 Eduardo Manzano, Mexican actor
 Ezequiel Manzano, Argentine-Italian footballer
 Fabián Manzano, Chilean footballer
 Gregorio Manzano, Spanish football coach
 Ignacio Urrutia Manzano, Chilean politician 
 Javier Manzano, Mexican photographer 
 Javier Manzano Salazar, Mexican politician 
 Jesús Manzano, Spanish cyclist
 Jesús Gil Manzano, Spanish football referee
 José Luis Manzano, Argentine businessman and politician
 José María Álvarez del Manzano, Spanish politician
 Juan Francisco Manzano, Cuban writer
 Juan Pío Manzano, Mexican politician
 Leonel Manzano, American track and field athlete, born in Mexico
 Luis Manzano, Philippine actor and television host
 María Manzano (born 1950), Spanish mathematical logician
 Matías Manzano, Argentine footballer
 Mauricio Manzano, Salvadoran footballer
 Miguel Manzano, Mexican actor
 Miriam Manzano, Australian figure skater
 Rafael Manzano Martos, Spanish architect
 Renato De Manzano, Italian footballer
 René Gómez Manzano, Cuban political activist
 Sofia Manzano, Brazilian politician
 Sonia Manzano, American actress and writer
 Virginia Manzano, Mexican actress
 Yasek Manzano Silva, Cuban trumpet player
 Daniel, Fabian and Alejandro Manzano, American musicians, brothers and members of the band Boyce Avenue

Other 
 Manzano High School, a public school in Albuquerque, New Mexico
 Jose Lopez Manzano Tuy National High School, a public school in the Philippines
 El Manzano prison, Chile
 Manzano pepper or Capsicum pubescens, a species of the genus Capsicum (pepper), primarily in Central and South America.